Rick Hansen Secondary School may refer to:

 Rick Hansen Secondary School (Abbotsford), in British Columbia, Canada
 Rick Hansen Secondary School (Mississauga), in Ontario, Canada